Rodney Presbyterian Church is a historic church in Alcorn, Mississippi, United States.

History
Plantation owner and millionaire David Hunt (1779-1861), also known as "King David," donated the land upon which the church was built.   Presbyterian Reverend Jeremiah Chamberlain began the building of the church in 1829.  And Speaking of Which

The church building was built from 1829 to 1832 in the Federal architectural style. It was built with red bricks, "rounded archives, "a stepped gable" and "an octagonal bell tower."

The church played a specific role during the American Civil War of 1861-1865. On Sunday, September 13, 1863, Reverend Baker invited crew members of the Union USS Rattler gunboat to attend his service. However, Confederates burst into the church to arrest them. When other Union crew members found out about the Confederate violation of Sunday truce, they fired a cannonball at the church, which damaged its front wall. The damage is still visible to this day.

It has been listed on the National Register of Historic Places since 1973.

References

Presbyterian churches in Mississippi
Churches on the National Register of Historic Places in Mississippi
Churches completed in 1832
19th-century Presbyterian church buildings in the United States
Churches in Jefferson County, Mississippi
National Register of Historic Places in Jefferson County, Mississippi
1832 establishments in Mississippi